K600 may stand for:

 Kaman HH-43 Huskie or K-600, a helicopter
 Sony Ericsson K600 mobile phone
 HMS St Brides Bay (K600), an anti-aircraft frigate